Shallow may refer to:

Places 
 Shallow (underwater relief), where the depth of the water is low compared to its surroundings
 Shallow Bay (disambiguation), various places
 Shallow Brook, New Jersey, United States
 Shallow Inlet, Victoria, Australia
 Shallow Lake, Idaho, United States
 Shallow Pond (Plymouth, Massachusetts), United States

People
 Hyron Shallow (born 1982), West Indian cricketer
 Parvati Shallow (born 1982), winner of the reality TV show Survivor: Micronesia

Arts, entertainment, and media 
 Shallow (album)
 Robert Shallow, a fictional character in two Shakespeare plays
 Verbena (band), later known as Shallow

Songs 
 "Shallow" (Lady Gaga and Bradley Cooper song), 2018
 "Shallow" (Porcupine Tree song), 2005
 "The Shallows", a song by Dog's Eye View from the album Daisy